The 1932–33 season was Blackpool F.C.'s 32nd season (29th consecutive) in the Football League. They competed in the 22-team Division One, then the top tier of English football, finishing bottom. They were relegated to Division Two.

Jimmy Hampson was the club's top scorer for the sixth consecutive season, with nineteen goals in total (eighteen in the league and one in the FA Cup).

On 17 October 1932, two days after Blackpool played Leicester City at Bloomfield Road, the ground hosted its first and thus far only full international match: England versus Ireland. England won by a single goal.

Table

Notes

References

Blackpool F.C.
Blackpool F.C. seasons